Berenice was the designation of a four-stage French experimental rocket, developed by O.N.E.R.A. (Office National d'Etudes et de Recherches Aérospatiales).

The twelve production rockets, Berenice 001 to Berenice 012, were tested from 1962 to 1966. The first stage, a SEPR 739 Stromboli, was stabilised by four SEPR 167 rockets developing . The second stage consisted of a SEPR 740, almost identical to the first stage. The third stage was a SEPR 200 Tramontane and the fourth stage comprised a Melanie rocket and payload.

See also 
 Veronique (rocket)
 French space program

References

Rockets and missiles
Space launch vehicles of France